"Drinking from the Bottle" is a song by Scottish DJ and record producer Calvin Harris from his third studio album, 18 Months. The song features British rapper Tinie Tempah. The song was released as a single on 27 January 2013. It has peaked at number five on the UK Singles Chart.

Music video
A lyric video to accompany the release of "Drinking from the Bottle" was first released onto YouTube on 2 December 2012 at a total length of four minutes and one second. The official video was uploaded to Harris's YouTube's account on 21 December, after being filmed in the first week of December 2012.

The video opens with actor Brad Dourif, as The Devil, speaking to his friend "Patrick" (Vader Vader) lead singer, Pat-Ric (McCaffery) Nasty, who is dressed as a wizard), talking about how he had sex with Joan of Arc in 1430, just a few months before her burning at the stake. The rest of the video features Harris and Tempah in a dark room with scantily-clad women, with Harris sitting inside a car and Tempah outside it. There are also scenes of drinking, drugs, violence, arson, sex, twerking and nudity, as well as Harris and Tempah meeting up with the devil. The video was accompanied by a parental advisory explicit content sign for extremely sexually explicit content and some strong language.

Critical reception
Robert Copsey of Digital Spy gave the song three out of five stars and wrote, "With lyrics about necking booze from buckets with sparklers, name-checking Rihanna, the Kardashians and, erm, Danny DeVito as well as a ravey breakdown that you could set your watch to, they've ticked all the necessary boxes for an easy chart hit. 'I know this crazy life can be a bitter pill to swallow,' he continues, prompting our weary response: 'Go on then, one last time won't hurt us... right?'."

Live performances
Harris and Tempah gave their first live performance of "Drinking from the Bottle" on The Jonathan Ross Show on 3 November 2012.

Track listing

Personnel
 Lead vocals – Patrick Okogwu
 Guest vocals – Calvin Harris, Tinie Tempah
 Producers – Calvin Harris, James F. Reynolds, Mark Knight

Charts and certifications

Weekly charts

Year-end charts

Certifications

References

2012 songs
2013 singles
Calvin Harris songs
Columbia Records singles
Songs written by Calvin Harris
Songs written by Tinie Tempah
Tinie Tempah songs